The Chuvash National Movement was the movement of the Chuvash people for national emancipation and equality. Spontaneous elements of the Chuvash national movement (CNM) were manifested, starting from the 16th century, in various forms of social performances. Evasion of taxes and duties, local armed actions of local importance, submission of petitions to the authorities, withdrawal to regions weakly controlled by the state, participation in large-scale anti-government protests, persistent resistance to mass Christianization (see O. Tomeev, Peasant uprising led By S. T. Razin, Peasant uprising led by E. I. Pugachev, Commission of Lieutenant Colonel A. I. Svechin, Uprising of Chuvash and Mari peasants in 1842) were evidence of the protest potential of the ethnos.

The beginning of unity of the Chuvash people 

The reforms of Alexander II and related socio-economic, political and spiritual transformations opened a new era in the history of the peoples of the Volga region. A significant factor in the national mobilization of the Chuvash ethnic group was the liberalization of social and political life associated with the expansion of citizens. rights and legal field, as well as educational space. N. I. Ilminsky, N. I. Zolotnitsky, I. Ya. Yakovlev, I. N. Ulyanov, Simbirsk Chuvash school played an important role in the development of school business and culture among the Chuvash population.  Socio-economic shifts and changes in the 2nd half of the 19th century were reflected in the public consciousness and prepared the ideological basis for the emergence of an organized CNM, the formulation of its slogans, political interests and demands.

At the turn of 19–20 centuries there was a consolidation of Chuvash ethnonation. Its basic features: the Chuvash language, which has grown to the level of a single literary language, professional culture, the emergence of national intelligentsia. Language and culture, the commonality of the Chuvash nation was supported by the compact residence of the bulk of the people in the common territory. By the end of the 19th century there was a final formation and stabilization of the configuration of the ethnic territory of the Chuvash (7 adjacent counties of Kazan and Simbirsk provinces), where 78% of the Chuvash lived. On the basis of ethnoconsolidation processes and the growth of consciousness among the Chuvash in the early 20th century clearly marked the beginnings of an organized CNM.

In the 1st decade of the 20th century, the national movement of the Chuvash people moved from the 1st phase, characterized by the emergence of national educators, Patriotic figures of education and culture, who were engaged in the study of the language, history and culture of the people, to the 2nd phase-the national – Patriotic agitation to spread self-consciousness to all The 3rd phase of the CNM ended with the formation of a mass movement with open political slogans and a network of national organizations formed for the purpose of ethnic emancipation, which occurred in 1917.

СNM during the First Russian revolution 
The peoples of the Volga region national movement was accelerated by the First Russian revolution of 1905–07, in which intertwined socio-political, economic and national contradictions and conflicts. The ideas of national rise were first of all carried by the young Chuvash intelligentsia, represented by teachers, priests and lawyers. Many of them were pupils of the Simbirsk Chuvash teacher's school, but could not be satisfied with the goals and objectives that I. Y.Yakovlev set at the time. The vast majority of representatives of the Chuvash intelligentsia shared the ideas of the SR party, which had the strongest influence on the Chuvash population of all revolutionary movements in the Volga region. Ideology and leaders of the CNM were formed in her environment. The Chuvash social revolutionaries demanded national and cultural autonomy. Publication of the newspaper "Khypar" (January 1906) contributed to the unity of the avant-garde forces of the nation, understanding the ways of social and cultural revival of the people. Newspaper "Khypar" stood at the origins of national journalism, which testified to a significant shift in Chuvash social thought, the range of which has expanded from educational to socio-political, state-legal views. The newspaper played a role in the state Duma elections. Parliamentarians from Chuvashia (Y.A. Abramov, N. P. Efremov, D. A. Kushnikov, K. V. Lavrsky, I. I. Sokolov, Z. M. Talantsev, A. F. Fedorov), regardless of party affiliation, spoke in their parliamentary activities for the development of education, in defense of national equality.

During the revolution of 1905–07 the movement turned Chuvash peasants, in which the agrarian question was put forward socio-political and national demands – civil rights and freedoms, equality of languages, schooling in their native language, the election of judges by the local population, the use of the Chuvash language in the proceedings, the formation of local management taking into account the national composition of the population, etc. In 1905–07, new forces in the face of youth and political radicals entered the arena of Chuvash social life, supplementing the concept of national unification on the basis of comprehensive education and culture with emphasis on the growth of political consciousness, the class struggle for the social liberation of the Chuvash people. Qualitative changes occurred in the Chuvash socio-political thought, which on the basis of enlightenment and liberal ideas had a General tendency to form a national ideology, did not go beyond the requirement of cultural and national autonomy. The idea of territorial autonomy was expressed only by some figures of Chuvash culture (I. N. Yurkin, G. A. Korenkov).

CNM after February revolution 
Developed after the February revolution of 1917 H. n. d. initially went within the framework of multiethnic territorial bodies of the peoples of the Volga-Kama region, developed a common form of organization-society (then the Union of small nationalities of the Volga region) and congresses of small nationalities of the Volga region. The first national Chuvash associations began to emerge in the spring of 1917: on 27 March, the Ufa Chuvash national society was created under the chairmanship Of G. I. Komissarov, by the summer a network of Chuvash national organizations was formed, which included not only provincial, but also County and rural ones.

The national upsurge was in its own way transformed in Church life. A number of clergymen became active figures of CNM (P. p. Shlenkin, D. F. Filimonov, T. A. Zemlyanitsky, G. T. Tikhonov, A. S. Ivanov, K. P. Prokopiev, etc.). As the main requirements they put forward: the appointment of Chuvash priests to Chuvash parishes, the introduction of the native language into Church worship, the establishment of the post of Chuvash Bishop.

Revived 1 May 1917 newspaper "Khypar" became a mouthpiece of socio-political and national aspirations of the ethnic group, called for the unity of all Chuvash.

A distinctive feature of the post-February period-the radical democratization of existing and the emergence of new political institutions, which in the national. they were inevitably filled with ethnic content. For the first time in history, Chuvash people were elected as chairmen of the Civil, Cheboksary and Yadrin Zemstvo councils. There were alternative forms of mass participation of the Chuvash population in social and political life-councils of deputies, peasant congresses and unions, soldiers. organizations, etc.

The most clearly national specificity was manifested in the activities of the County peasant congresses, which raised and discussed the issues of national self-determination of peoples and the administrative and territorial structure of Russia. Nationally oriented were the associations of Chuvash servicemen (Chuvash military committees and fellow countrymen), in their midst a new generation of political leaders was emerging (A. D. Krasnov, D. P. Petrov, G. T. Titov, etc.). The diversity of forms of CH. n. d. after February 1917 reflected other public associations, for example, such as teachers ' unions, the Union of Chuvash students, etc. They did not set themselves a program of national and political goals, but formed a social space for the development of social and civic initiatives of Chuvash society.

February 1917 sharply stimulated multipartyism, bringing to the fore the liberal and socialist parties, which in their programs inevitably had to articulate clearly the vision and ways of solving national problems. Political parties, with the exception of the black hundreds, operating in the Chuvash region, put forward a demand for autonomy within the Russian state, transformed into a democratic or Federal. The leaders of the socialist revolutionaries as the program goals of the party in the summer of 1917 put forward the slogans of the democratic Republic with the prospect of transformation into a Federal state with the onset of appropriate socio-political conditions, national-cultural autonomy for the Chuvash, proportional-national representation in elected authorities.

The strategy of national rise and ideological platform of CH. n. d. were adopted at the all-Chuvash national forum in June 1917 in Simbirsk (see Congress of the all-Chuvash national), which elected the Central Chuvash organization-the Chuvash national society (CNS).

CNM after October revolution 
The overthrow of the Provisional government and the transfer of power into the hands of a coalition of Bolsheviks and left SRS in October 1917 created a new configuration of political forces in the country. The Soviet government proclaimed in its decrees the de jure right of the peoples of Russia to free self-determination until the formation of an independent state.

Largely under the influence of this circumstance, at the end of 1917, the national leaders of the Tatars and Bashkirs put forward a plan for regional autonomy of the Middle Volga region and the Urals (Volga-Ural state, Ural-Volga state, middle Volga and South Ural state, Volga-Kama state, Volga-Ural Soviet Republic or Tatar-Bashkir Soviet Republic).

In the discussions about its creation the main requirements of the Chuvash representatives attended the equality and sovereignty of all its Nations and all national-cultural autonomy; the generated state was seen as an inseparable part of Russia, and internal administrative unit as "regiona (regional) Federal Republic of nationalities". The final position in the disputes about the Tatar-Bashkir Soviet Republic was expressed at the all-Chuvash workers 'and peasants' Congress (June 1918), which opposed the inclusion of the Chuvash population.

At the end of February–March 1918 there was a split in the CH. n. d., won the bloc of left forces, which included the left socialists-revolutionaries, the party of Chuvash socialists-nationalists and non-party soldiers, teachers and students who recognized the platform of Soviet power. Members of the left bloc seized the property of the editorial office of the newspaper "Khypar" from the right SRS and started publishing a new printing body "Kanash". On 5 March the Chuvash left socialist Committee was formed, on its initiative the Commissariat for Chuvash Affairs under the Kazan provincial Council was opened.

The final disengagement among the leaders of the C. N. D. occurred in the summer of 1918, when a large group of national figures, active. CHNO members, Chuvash delegates of the Constituent Assembly (G. F. Alunov, S. N. Nikolaev, D. P. Petrov, G. T. Titov, I. V. Vasiliev) moved to the anti-Soviet camp. However, the movement continued its organizational formalization in the form of Soviet-party organizations. In 1918–19 in Kazan, Simbirsk, Samar. and Saratov provinces arose Chuvash sub-departments in the provincial departments of the Executive committees of the Soviets, created the corresponding section at the provincial committees of the RCP(b); the Chuvash sub-divisions (sections) also operated under the political departments of the red Army headquarters and revolutionary military councils. The Central Soviet institution was the Chuvash Department under the People's Commissariat for nationalities of the RSFSR headed by D. S. Elmen.

Chuvash AO – Chuvash ASSR 
Since the 2nd Polina of 1918, the leaders of the CNM began to lean towards the idea of national-territorial autonomy-the creation of the Chuvash administrative-territorial unit. The project of formation of the Chuvash labor commune is documented. The idea of organizing a separate national-territorial unit for the Chuvash people was embodied in the creation of the Chuvash Autonomous region with its subsequent transformation into the Chuvash ASSR. Since the 2nd Polina of 1918, the leaders of the CH. n. d. began to lean towards the idea of national-territorial autonomy-the creation of the Chuvash administrative-territorial unit. The project of formation of the Chuvash labor commune is documented. The idea of organizing a separate national-territorial unit for the Chuvash people was embodied in the creation of the Chuvash Autonomous region with its subsequent transformation into the Chuvash ASSR. 

There was a network of national educational institutions – in Bashkiria, Tatarstan, Simbirsk, Samara and other provinces. Chuvash Newspapers were produced in Samara and Kazan. For Chuvash residents of all regions of the USSR in Moscow was published in the Chuvash language newspaper "Voice of workers". In Bashkiria, Simbirsk province, Tatar ASSR, Saratov province, Kazakhstan and Siberia were formed Chuvash national administrative-territorial units. In the 1920s there was a network of Chuvash representations at the Central party and Soviet bodies and institutions.

The abandonment of the new economic policy, the formation of a totalitarian society were accompanied by the curtailment of democratic processes in the sphere of national relations: the prevailing trend here since the early 1930s has been towards unification. The national began to be interpreted as nationalistic and opposed to the international. The network of Chuvash representations in Moscow was liquidated, the publication of the Central newspaper in the Chuvash language "Kommunar"was suspended. Under the banner of the fight against "nationalism" was forgotten experience taking into account the interests of all ethno-territorial groups of Chuvashes, from official documents disappeared mention of the Chuvash, compactly living outside the Republic; curtailed the processes of indigenization and implementation of the Chuvash language policy. In the mid-1960s, the theory of erasing national differences, merging nationalities into one "Soviet people"was proclaimed.

Perestroyka /Restructuring 
The situation in the sphere of national relations began to change radically in the years of perestroika. Since the end of 1980s again revived CNM. One of its organizational forms was the coordination center for support of creative youth (CSCY) at the Chuvash regional Committee of the Komsomol, the decision to establish which was taken in April 1987. The CSCY consisted of young writers, artists, actors, scientists, humanitarians, students. Kctm events caused sharp discussions about the prospects of the poetic word, the tradition of the artistic and poetic avant-garde of the early 20th century, the status of the native language and the future of national cultures, the right of the nation to free political, economic and cultural development.

In the spring of 1988, a group of researchers of CHNII YALE and ChSU took the initiative to create the Society of I. ya. Yakovlev, the program and Charter of the society as a people's social and political movement were developed. Among the goals and objectives proclaimed moral and national revival of the society, the Association of national-cultural aspirations of all Chuvash people regardless of where they live, the sovereignty of the Chuvash Autonomous Republic in the sphere of economy, politics and culture, the preservation and development of national traditions, giving Chuvash state language, study and popularization of a heritage of I. Ya. Yakovlev and other. A discussion took place in the Republican mass media, on 30 November 1988 a broad meeting was held to discuss the program goals and objectives of The Yakovlev Society.

The initiative met with opposition from the Chuvash. the regional Committee of the CPSU, and scheduled for April 1989 constituent Congress was banned.

ChSCC – CNC 

As an alternative, in December 1989, the founding Congress of the Chuvash social and cultural center (ChSCC) was held, the Chairman of which was elected M. N. Yukhma. In February–March, the Council of Ministers of the Chuvash ASSR approved the Charter and platform of the CSCC. In March 1991, the founding Congress of the Chuvash national revival party (Chuvash atalanu party, CHAP) was held, the program of which was aimed at achieving economic and political sovereignty of Chuvashia. On 9 October 1992, the founding Congress of the Chuvash National Congress (CNC) was held, the leitmotif of which was the implementation of state sovereignty in full. Chairman of the PNP was elected A. P. Khoosanguy.

Since the late 1980s, there have been national and cultural associations (NCA) of Chuvash in various regions of Russia, primarily in the Ural-Volga region (the republics of Bashkortostan and Tatarstan, Ulyanovsk and Samara regions), where the largest mass of the Chuvash population lives relatively compactly outside the territory of Chuvashia. Different forms of NCOs were created in Moscow and St. Petersburg, in the CIS countries (Kazakhstan, Moldova, Ukraine) and the Baltic States (Latvia, Estonia). After the adoption of the Law of the Russian Federation "on national-cultural autonomy" (1996), the Chuvash national-cultural autonomy (ChNCA) began to form. By 2011, there are 85 Chuvash NCOs in the Russian Federation, including 25 NCAs. In 2001, the Federal national-cultural autonomy of the Chuvash people of Russia was approved as an extraterritorial public-state entity.

Most Chuvash NCOs and NCAs are engaged in cultural and educational activities-the creation of folklore groups, the traditional Chuvash holidays, the publication of local Republican and regional newspapers, books of local lore and historical and ethno-cultural content, take initiatives to support national school education (the study of the native language and literature), the organization of Chuvash radio and television programs at the local level.

See also 

 Chuvash National Congress
 Chuvash National Museum
 List of Chuvashes
 Chuvash Wikipedia
 Chuvash National Broadcasting Company
 Chuvash national radio
 ChuvashTet
 Society for the study of the native land
 The entry of Chuvashia into the Russian state

Literatura 
 С.В. Щербаков, "Чувашское национальное движение 1917–1921 годах. Взлёты и падения." /Chuvash national movement of 1917–1921. UPS and downs.

References

Weblinks 
 What brought Chuvash and Jews together in 1917? And could the Ulyanovsk become the capital of the Chuvash Republic?
 Sergey Shcherbakov: Formation of autonomy of the Chuvash people in 1917–1921: periodization and new approaches 
 Sergey Shcherbakov: The nature of the Chuvash national movement and its participants in 1917
 Sergey Shcherbakov: External factors that influenced the form and methods of the national movement of the Chuvash people in 1917
 Sergey Shcherbakov: The position of the Chuvash national movement at the regional and national level at the beginning of 1918

Chuvashia
Independence movements
Chuvash people